Iqbal (قبال‎)) is a name and surname meaning "good fortune” and “prosperity” but also the Punjabi meaning of “power” “force” and “one who is strong”.

It can also be spelled as Eqbal, Ikbal, or Eghbal.

It is a common name in Middle Eastern, Central Asian, and South Asian countries 

The last and first name "Iqbal" also refers to jaat people belonging to the Punjab region in India and Pakistan.

Given Forename 
Iqbal Abdulla (born 1989), Indian cricketer
Iqbal Ahmed (born 1956), British-Bangladeshi entrepreneur
Iqbal Z. Ahmed (born 1946), Pakistani businessman
Iqbal Ahmad Khan (1954-2020), Indian classical vocalist
Iqbal Ahmed Saradgi (born 1944), Indian politician
Iqbal Arshad, American engineer
Iqbal Ashhar (born 1965), Indian poet
Iqbal Athas (born 1944), Sri Lankan journalist
Iqbal Azad, Indian actor
Muhammad Iqbal Bahoo (1944–2012), Pakistani Sufi singer
Iqbal Bahar Chowdhury (born 1940), Bangladeshi news presenter
Iqbal Bano (1935–2009), Pakistani singer
Iqbal Baraka (born 1942), Egyptian journalist
Iqbal Bhatkal (born 1970), Indian terrorist
Iqbal Butt (born 1956), Pakistani cricketer
Iqbal Durrani (born 1956), Indian film director
Iqbal Kazmi, Pakistani human rights activist
Iqbal Hasan Mahmud, Bangladeshi politician
Iqbal Hussain (born 1993), Singaporean footballer
Iqbal Hussain Qureshi (1937-2012), Pakistani chemist and professor
Iqbal Khan (director), British-Pakistani theatre director
Iqbal Khan (general), Pakistani general
Iqbal Masih (1983–1995), Pakistani Christian child activist
Eqbal Mehdi (1946–2008), Pakistani painter
Iqbal Qasim (born 1953), Pakistani cricketer
Iqbal Quadir (born 1958), Bengali entrepreneur
Iqbal Siddiqui (born 1974), Indian cricketer
Iqbal Singh (academic), Indian-American academic
Iqbal Singh (politician) (born 1945), Indian politician
Iqbal Singh (spiritual leader) (1926-2022), Indian spiritual leader
Iqbal Theba (born 1963), Pakistani-American television actor
Iqbal Wahhab (born 1963), British-Bangladeshi restaurateur

Given Surname 
Iqbal (politician), Mohammad Iqbal (born 1954), Indian politician
Amer Iqbal, Pakistani theoretical physicist
Amjad Iqbal (born 1983), English footballer
Ahsan Iqbal (born 1958), Pakistani politician
Asif Iqbal (disambiguation), multiple people
Dariush Eghbali (born 1951), Iranian singer
Faisal Iqbal (disambiguation), multiple people
Javed Iqbal (disambiguation), multiple people
Imraz Iqbal, Fijian businessman
Mohsin Iqbal (born 1983), Indian cricketer
Moneeb Iqbal (born 1986), Scottish cricketer
Muhammad Iqbal (Allama Iqbal, 1877–1938), Pakistan's national poet, philosopher and intellectual
Muhammed Zafar Iqbal (born 1952), Bangladeshi scientist, professor and author
Muzaffar Iqbal (born 1954), Pakistani-Canadian chemist
Nasira Iqbal, (born 1940) Pakistani Judge
Nazia Iqbal, Pashto singer
Razia Iqbal (born 1962), British journalist and presenter
Rao Sikandar Iqbal (1943–2010), former Defence Minister of Pakistan
Shahid Iqbal (born 1953), Pakistani Navy admiral
Tamim Iqbal (born 1989), Bangladeshi cricketer
Waleed Iqbal, Pakistani lawyer
Zafar Iqbal (disambiguation), multiple people
Zidane Iqbal, Iraqi footballer

See also
 Iqbal (disambiguation)